Samantha Dowd Elliott (born 1975) is an American lawyer from New Hampshire who is a United States district judge of the United States District Court for the District of New Hampshire.

Education 

Elliott received a Bachelor of Arts, cum laude, from Colgate University in 1997 and a Juris Doctor from Columbia Law School in 2006.

Career 

From 2006 until 2021, Elliott was a partner and vice president at Gallagher, Callahan & Gartrell, P.C., in Concord, New Hampshire. While at the law firm, she served as president from 2015 to 2020 and as a hiring partner from 2014 to 2019.

She has been a member of New Hampshire Legal Assistance and the Legal Advice Referral Center. In June 2021, she became co-chair of the founding board of directors for 603 Legal Aid, an organization that provides pro bono statewide legal aid. Elliott served on its committee from 2018 to 2021.

Federal judicial service 

On September 30, 2021, President Joe Biden nominated Elliott to serve as a United States district judge of the United States District Court for the District of New Hampshire. President Biden nominated Elliott to the seat vacated by Judge Paul Barbadoro, who assumed senior status on March 1, 2021. On November 3, 2021, a hearing on her nomination was held before the Senate Judiciary Committee. On December 2, 2021, her nomination was reported out of committee by a 15–7 vote. On December 14, 2021, the United States Senate invoked cloture on her nomination by a 59–40 vote. On December 15, 2021, she was confirmed by a 62–37 vote. She received her judicial commission on December 21, 2021. She was sworn into office on December 22, 2021.

References

External links 

1975 births
Living people
21st-century American judges
21st-century American women lawyers
21st-century American lawyers
21st-century American women judges
Colgate University alumni
Columbia Law School alumni
Judges of the United States District Court for the District of New Hampshire
New Hampshire lawyers
People from Orange, New Jersey
United States district court judges appointed by Joe Biden